Ali Sabry or Ali Sabri is an Arabic name given to

Ali Sabri (1920–1991), Egyptian politician
Ali Sabri Raheem (born 1963), Sri Lankan politician
Ali Sabry (Egyptian politician), former Egyptian minister 
Ali Sabry (Sri Lankan politician), Sri Lankan lawyer and politician, Minister of Justice